"Elaine" is a song recorded by Swedish pop group ABBA. It was used as the B-side to the 1980 single "The Winner Takes It All". It was not included on any of their original albums but was later included as a bonus track on the 2001 reissue of Super Trouper.

Synopsis
The song is about a "devil-may-care path in pursuit of love".

Composition

ABBA: Let the Music Speak describes "Elaine" as a "bold and brazen up-tempo number", adding that it has a "wealth of treated synth effects". The pace remains the same throughout the song, and the intro has a "melodic riff that is squeezed and contorted over a series of suspended chords". This is followed by a "whistlable refrain". At the end of the second verse, the synths mimic the girls' voices.

Analysis
The song has a degree of programmatic irony, as the "extrevert nature" of the refrain juxtaposes "Agnetha and Frida's decisive and cutting unison stabs".

Critical reception
Abba - Uncensored on the Record says the song is "OK, in a rather frantic way", and adds that it "paled in comparison" to the song it was paired with in the single "The Winner Takes It All", widely regarded as the best song ABBA ever recorded.

References

1980 singles
ABBA songs